The Sri Lanka montane rain forests is an ecoregion found above 1,000 m in the central highlands of Sri Lanka. Owing to their rich biodiversity, this region is considered to be a super-hotspot within endemic hotspots of global importance. These forests are cooler than lowland forests and therefore they have ideal conditions for growth of cloud forests. These forests classifications tropical sub montane forest, tropical sub-montane and tropical upper montane. Half of Sri Lanka's endemic flowering plants and 51 percent of the endemic vertebrates are restricted to these forests. More than 34 percent of Sri Lanka's endemic trees, shrubs, and herbs can only be found in this ecoregion. Twisted, stunted trees are a common sight in these forests, together with many varieties of orchids, mosses and ferns. The trees of montane rain forests grow to a height 10–15 meters, shorter than the lowland rain forest trees. These high altitude forests are the catchment area for most of Sri Lanka's major rivers.

Forest cover
Sri Lanka's montane forests are located above 1,220 m. The montane rain forests cover 3,099.5 ha in total, or 0.05 percent of Sri Lanka's total area. These forests are found in the mountain tops, such as Pidurutalagala, Kikilimana, Meepilimana, Agrabopaththalawa, Adam's Peak and Hakgala. In lower elevations, at altitudes ranging 1,000–1,500 m, submontane forests occur; those forests account for 1.04 percent of the nation's area, totalling 65,793.3 ha.

Geological history
Sri Lanka detached from the Deccan peninsula during the end of the Miocene epoch, but its origin lies within Gondwanaland. According to biogeographic patterns southwestern lowland wet forests became isolated from the nearest wet forests in the mainland soon after the separation when climatic changes created drier, warmer conditions in the lowland. Although the two lands bridged in the Pleistocene subsequently, intervening dry habitat prevented the exchange of wet climate adapted species with wet forests in India. This resulted in southwestern species to evolve and specialize separately, giving rise higher to the higher level of endemism that can be seen today.

Features
Some of the mountain peaks of the central highlands reach above 2500 m, although the average height is 1800 m. Knuckles rises to 1800 m, with an average elevation of 1500 m.  Because of the elevation, ambient temperature is cooler than in the lowlands. The mean temperature in this area ranges between 15 °C-20 °C. In the mornings of the winter months of December to February, ground frost appears.

The average annual rainfall ranges from 2000–2500 mm. The southwestern monsoon brings most of the rain from May to September, but the northeastern monsoon contributes a fair amount of rain as well. All of the island's major rivers arise in the central highlands, and montane rain forests act as the main catchment area.

Flora
The vegetation of this ecoregion is determined by the climate and the elevation. Montane moist forests vegetation is dominated by Dipterocarpus while montane savanna and cloud forests with Rhododendron. Canopies of Shorea-Calophyllum-Syzygium community can be seen in submontane forests. The Understory of the higher elevation is dominated by Strobilanthes. The Peak Wilderness of all montane rain forests possibly be the only forest area dominated by endemic Stemonoporus of family Dipterocarpaceae. Rhododendron species thrive in the wet montane grasslands known as wet pathanas in Sinhalese. Asian elephant, who roamed freely in these forests, is now locally extinct. Knuckles Range's vegetation  differ from the rest of the central highlands because of the geographical detachment, is having a Myristica-Cullenia-Aglaia-Litsea community.

Biodiversity
The montane forests accommodate more endemic species than the lowland rain forests. Half of the country's flowering plants and 51 percent of the endemic vertebrates are confined to these forests. The isolated Knuckles range harbours several relict, endemic flora and fauna that are distinct from central massif. More than 34 percent of Sri Lanka's endemic trees, shrubs, and herbs are only found in these forests.

Fauna

Mammals
Montane rain forests harbours eight near-endemic mammals, and five are strict endemics. Small mammals in Sri Lanka shows a great degree of diversity, such as rodents, shrews and bats. Of these mammals 70 percent are smaller than a small cat. This area is an atypical habitat to the largest carnivore of Sri Lanka, Sri Lanka leopard. The leopard has categorised as threatened. Another five rodents listed endangered.
 
Sri Lankan long-tailed shrew
Kelaart's long-clawed shrew
Pearson's long-clawed shrew
Sri Lankan shrew
Jungle shrew

The near-endemic and strict endemic mammals harbours in the area listed below. Strict endemic species marked with an asterisk.

Asian highland shrew
Kelaart's long-clawed shrew*
Sri Lankan long-tailed shrew*
Pearson's long-clawed shrew*
Purple-faced langur
Golden palm civet
Layard's palm squirrel
Dusky palm squirrel
Travancore flying squirrel
Ceylon spiny mouse
Nolthenius's long-tailed climbing mouse
Nillu rat*
Ohiya rat*

Birds
Sri Lanka montane rain forests includes in EBA Sri Lanka. Out of twenty near-endemic birds, five of the bird species are strict endemic.

Sri Lanka wood pigeon
Sri Lanka grey hornbill
Red-faced malkoha
Sri Lanka junglefowl - The national bird of Sri Lanka
Sri Lanka blue magpie
White-faced starling
Sri Lanka myna
Orange-billed babbler
Sri Lanka whistling thrush*
Dull-blue flycatcher*
Yellow-eared bulbul*
Sri Lanka white-eye*
Sri Lanka bush warbler*
Spot-winged thrush
Kashmir flycatcher
Brown-capped babbler
Yellow-fronted barbet
Sri Lanka hanging parrot
Layard's parakeet
Chestnut-backed owlet

Reptiles and amphibians
Reptiles in Sri Lanka show more endemism than birds and mammals. Frogs and lizards are among the species is still being newly discovered, along with fishes and crabs.

Threats and conservation
The 15 years from 1990 to 2005 Sri Lanka showed one of the highest deforestation rates of primary forests in the world. During that period almost 18 percent of Sri Lanka's forest cover was lost, while the deforestation rate also accelerated. The fauna of Sri Lanka also threatened. A survey done in 2005 found 17 of Sri Lanka's frogs have become extinct in the past decade and another 11 species face imminent threat of extinction. From 1820 large scale forest cleared for coffee plantations and later for tea in the montane forests. The remnant patches of forest corridors logged for agriculture crops. The illicit mining of gems happen even in restricted areas.

The reason for the dying back of montane forest is attributed toxicity of soil. The Knuckles range face a different threat. Cultivation of spices especially cardamom at large scale threatens clearing of the forest.

Invasive exotic plant species such as Mist Flower (Ageratina riparia), Purple Plague (Miconia calvescens), Blue Star (Aristea ecklonii) and Coster's Curse (Clidemia hirta) that increasingly spread into otherwise well protected mountain forest areas and crowd away the native Sri Lankan flora are a major threat, if not the largest one, to Sri Lankan montane rain forest flora and fauna.

Currently the ecoregion is being protected by five protected areas. Those protected areas together accounts only 457 km2 of area. These protected areas are;

Gallery

See also

Cloud forest
Tropical and subtropical moist broadleaf forests

References

Ecoregions of Sri Lanka
 
Forests of Sri Lanka
Indomalayan ecoregions
Montane forests
Tropical and subtropical moist broadleaf forests